Carlo Antonio Bussi (1658 – 15 July 1690) was a Swiss painter.
Bussi was born in Bissone. He primarily painted church interiors. In 1682 he married Margarete, the daughter of another Swiss painter Carpoforo Tencalla. After his father-in-law's death in 1685, Bussi completed some of Tencalla's projects. Bussi died in Vöcklabruck in 1690.

References

This article was initially translated from the German Wikipedia.

17th-century Swiss painters
Swiss male painters
1658 births
1690 deaths